Dineshchandra R. Agrawal Infracon Private Limited or DRA Infracon Pvt Ltd is an infrastructure development and construction company based at Ahmedabad in Gujarat, India. It was founded by Mr. Dineshchandra Rameshwarji Agrawal at Deesa in Banaskantha district of Gujarat in 1972. DRA Infracon got incorporated in the Ministry of Corporate Affairs on November 07, 2003.

It is one of the leading construction companies in India having construction contracts in Airports, Bridges, Highways, Expressways, Metro Rail, Railways, Smart Cities, Water supply etc.

Segments
The company has divided its projects into 7 segments/ businesses that is, i. Road and Highway, ii. Bridge, Flyover and Grade separator, iii. Aviation Infrastructure, iv. Railway and Metro Rail, v. Building construction, vi. Water supply and Waste Management and vii. Smart Cities and Urban Development.

Key projects
 Ahmedabad Metro (East-West Corridor)
 Chennai Metro (Line-3)
 Jaipur Smart City (smart roads)
 Jogbani–Biratnagar Integrated Check Post
 Mumbai-Ahmedabad HSR (Bullet train)
 Rohini Heliport (Delhi)
 Sabarmati Riverfront (Ahmedabad)

Expressways
 Ahmedabad–Dholera Expressway (38 km only)
 Amritsar–Jamnagar Expressway (24 km only)
 DND–KMP Expressway (Delhi to Sohna)
 Delhi–Mumbai Expressway (84 km only)
 Raipur–Visakhapatnam Expressway (04 km in Odisha)

Highways & Bridges
 Barmer–Jalore section of SH-16 in Rajasthan
 Indore–Dewas section of NH-3
 Maitri Setu (India-Bangladesh)
 Mechi Bridge (India-Nepal)
 Meerut–Shamli–Karnal (NH-709A) (88 km)
 Munabao-Dhanana-Tanot (NH-70) (274 km)
 Raiganj–Dalkhola section of NH-12 (55 km)
 Salasar–Nagaur section of NH-58 (120 km)

Airports
 Gondia Airport (Maharashtra)
 Itanagar Airport (Arunachal Pradesh)
 Runway at Guwahati Airport
 Runway at Hindan Air Force Station
 Runway at INS Utkrosh (Port Blair)
 Runway at Leh Air Force Station (Ladakh)
 Runway at Nal Air Force Station (Bikaner)
 Runway at Palam Air Force Station 
 Runway at Suratgarh Air Force Station
 Runway at Tezpur Air Force Station
 Runway at Vijayawada Airport

Awards

 National Highways Excellence Awards (2021): Gold award in the category "Outstanding work in challenging conditions" by MoRTH in June 2022.
 National Highways Excellence Awards (2020): Gold award in Project Management (PPP) by MoRTH in January 2021.
 National Highways Excellence Awards (2020): Silver award in Project Management (EPC) by MoRTH in January 2021.
 1st rank for India's fastest-growing construction company in the Medium category by Construction World in 2020.
 National Highways Excellence Awards (2019): Gold award in Project Management (PPP) by MoRTH in January 2020.
 2nd rank for India's fastest-growing construction company in the Medium category by Construction World in 2019.

See also
 Adani Group
 Dilip Buildcon
 Sadbhav Engineering

References

External links 
 

Companies based in Ahmedabad
Construction and civil engineering companies of India
Indian companies established in 1972
Construction and civil engineering companies established in 1972
1972 establishments in Gujarat